Romish Jalilov (born 21 November 1995) is a Tajikistani footballer who plays for FC Istiklol and the Tajikistan national football team.

Career
In March 2015 Jalilov joined Regar-TadAZ on a half-season loan deal. Jalilov also spent the 2016 season on loan at Regar-TadAZ, returning to Istiklol on 26 December 2016.

During the 2020 Tajikistan Higher League season summer transfer window, Jalilov was reregistered with FC Istiklol.

Career statistics

Club

International

Statistics accurate as of match played 27 March 2018

Honors
Istiklol
 Tajik League (3): 2014, 2015, 2017
 Tajik Cup (2): 2013, 2014
 Tajik Supercup (2): 2014, 2018

References

External links
 

1995 births
Living people
Tajikistani footballers
Tajikistan international footballers
FC Istiklol players
Footballers at the 2014 Asian Games
Association football midfielders
Asian Games competitors for Tajikistan
Tajikistan Higher League players